The Grand Lodge of India (GLI) is the main governing body of Freemasonry within India, it was officially constituted on Friday 24 November 1961.

There were three delegations from the Grand Lodge of Scotland, Grand Lodge of Ireland and Grand Lodge of England in that order.

Out of a total of 277 individual Lodges in India already existing at the time, 145 opted for the new Grand Lodge of India. This represented a little over 52 per cent of the Warranted Lodges in India.

Advent of Freemasonry in India

Freemasonry traces its roots in India in the early years of the 18th century. In 1730 officers of the East India Company held their meetings in Fort William in Calcutta. The number given to the Lodge was 72.

The Goshamal Baradari, Hyderabad, built in 1682 by Sultan Abul Hassan Tana Shah, is the oldest building used as a Masonic Temple in India. Built in 1682, it was donated to the fraternity in 1872 by the 6th Nizam of Kingdom of Hyderabad - Mir Mahbub Ali Khan.

Philanthropy
Under the Jyotirgamaya, initiated by Grand Master Dr Balaram Biswakumar to mark the Golden Jubilee of the GLI; The Grand Lodge of India took the initiative to light up 50 villages across remote areas in the country that did not have access to electricity till date.
The GLI constructed 74 houses for the tsunami-affected, building a 10,000 sq.ft hall in Pallam village in Kanyakumari.
The GLI also organizes classrooms for children in prisons, and renders help for disaster victims.  The GLI has close to 500 Lodges in India with close to 25,000 members.

References

External links
 Grand Lodge of India official website

Grand Lodges
Freemasonry in India
1961 establishments in India
Clubs and societies in India
Organizations established in 1961